Loïc Bruno Perrin (born 7 August 1985) is a French former professional footballer who played as a centre-back. He spent all of his professional career with his hometown club Saint-Étienne.

Club career
Perrin made his debut for Saint-Etienne in 2003 whilst the club was playing in Ligue 2. On 20 April 2013, Perrin played for Saint-Etienne in their Coupe de la Ligue final victory over Rennes.

In 2017, Perrin signed a three-year deal to keep him at Saint-Étienne until the end of 2020.

On 24 July 2020, in the last game of his career, Perrin was sent off in the first half of the Coupe de France Final for a foul on Kylian Mbappé, who suffered an ankle injury; Paris Saint-Germain won the match 1–0.

International career
On 6 November 2014, Perrin was called up to France manager Didier Deschamps' 23-man squad for friendly matches against Albania and Sweden. He was called up again on 9 November 2015 as a replacement for the injured Mamadou Sakho to face Germany and England in friendlies.

Career statistics

Honours 
Saint-Étienne
 Coupe de la Ligue: 2012–13
 Ligue 2: 2003–04
 Coupe de France runner-up: 2019–20

France U21
 Toulon Tournament: 2005

Individual
 Ligue 1 Team of the Year: 2013–14

See also 
 List of one-club men in association football

References

External links 

 
 
 

1985 births
Living people
Footballers from Saint-Étienne
French footballers
France youth international footballers
France under-21 international footballers
Association football defenders
AS Saint-Étienne players
Ligue 1 players
Championnat National 2 players